Ostermann-Arena (formerly Wilhelm Dopatka Halle and Smidt-Arena) is an indoor sporting arena located in Leverkusen, Germany.  The capacity of the arena is 3,500 people.  It is home to the Bayer Giants Leverkusen basketball team.

As Wilhelm Dopatka Halle, it was one of the host arenas for the FIBA EuroBasket 1985.

References

Wilhelm-Dopatka-Halle in the Leverkusen-guide

Indoor arenas in Germany
Buildings and structures in Leverkusen
Sports venues in North Rhine-Westphalia